Cosequin is a nutritional supplement for animals. It claims  to support joints in pets. 

Cosequin is manufactured in the by Nutramax Laboratories Veterinary Sciences, Inc. It contains TRH122(R) chondroitin sulfate, FCHG49(R) glucosamine, and manganese ascorbate. Cosequin comes in formulas specific for cats, dogs and horses.

According to the manufacturer Cosequin may be useful for pets with osteoarthritis (OA), but the efficacy is disputed. Glucosamine is used in equine medicine, but little evidence indicates that it has any value in the treatment of joint disease in horses. Since glucosamine can aid in the production of glycosaminoglycans, which are parts of the protective layer of the urinary tract, it has been used in cats suffering from lower urinary tract disease (FLUTD). However, efficacy has not been definitively demonstrated.

References

Veterinary drugs